Edward David Gerard Llewellyn, Baron Llewellyn of Steep,  (born 23 September 1965) is a British diplomat and former political adviser serving as the British Ambassador to Italy since 2022. He previously served as the British Ambassador to France from 2016 to 2021 and as the Downing Street Chief of Staff under former prime minister David Cameron from 2010 to 2016.

In February 2022, he was appointed British ambassador to Italy. He presented his credentials to Italian president Sergio Mattarella on 7 April 2022.

Early life and career 
Llewellyn was educated at Sunningdale School. He later attended Eton College, where he was a year above David Cameron. Llewellyn left Eton in 1983 and spent a brief amount of time working at Conservative Central Office, before studying at New College, Oxford, where he was steward (i.e. president) of the College JCR. New College contemporaries included Rageh Omaar, Steve Hilton and Ian Katz.

The UK government website says that Llewellyn spent four years (from 1988 to 1992) working for the Conservative Party's research department, including a year as Private Secretary to Margaret Thatcher.

Political career 
After leaving Oxford, he was employed as an aide to Governor Chris Patten in Hong Kong from 1992 to 1997, as a member of Patten's 'Cabinet' following Patten's appointment as a European Commissioner from 1999 to 2002, and then as Chief of Staff to the former Liberal Democrat Leader Paddy Ashdown in his role as high representative for Bosnia and Herzegovina from 2002 to 2005.

Llewellyn was appointed a Member of the Order of the British Empire (MBE) in the 1997 Birthday Honours and promoted to Officer (OBE) in the 2006 New Year Honours.

Llewellyn was appointed as an Honorary Captain in the Royal Naval Reserve in July 2021.

Chief of Staff to David Cameron 
Following David Cameron's victory in the Conservative leadership election in December 2005, Llewellyn was hired to be Cameron's personal chief of staff in his capacity as leader of the Opposition. Llewellyn continued in this role until 2010.

Negotiations over coalition 
He served as part of the Conservative negotiating team, along with George Osborne, William Hague and Oliver Letwin, when they were negotiating a possible deal with the Liberal Democrats after the 2010 general election. Their negotiations were successful and they created the Conservative–Liberal Democrat coalition agreement leading to the formation of a coalition government.

Downing Street Chief of Staff 
Cameron became Prime Minister and appointed Llewellyn to the post of Downing Street chief of staff. In July 2011, several newspapers reported that Llewellyn asked Metropolitan Police Assistant Commissioner John Yates not to speak to Cameron about the News International phone hacking scandal.

Following the Conservative Party's election victory at the 2015 general election, Llewellyn was sworn into the Privy Council on 14 May 2015.

House of Lords
In August 2016, he was nominated for a life peerage in David Cameron's Resignation Honours and was created Baron Llewellyn of Steep, of Steep in the County of Hampshire, on 20 October. He took his seat on 31 October, when he was introduced by Chris Patten and William Hague.

Ambassador to France
It was announced on 23 September 2016 that he would become British Ambassador to France, and it was reported that he will not sit in the House of Lords while serving as ambassador. He took up the post on 9 November 2016, being referred to as Edward Llewellyn. Llewellyn was succeeded as ambassador by Menna Rawlings in summer 2021, but it was announced he would transfer to another Diplomatic Service appointment.

Ambassador to Italy
On 18 January 2022 it was announced that Llewelyn would succeed Jill Morris as British Ambassador to Italy and Non-Resident Ambassador to San Marino. He presented his credentials to president Sergio Mattarella on 7 April 2022.

References

 

1965 births
Living people
Alumni of New College, Oxford
British special advisers
Life peers created by Elizabeth II
Conservative Party (UK) life peers
Conservative Party (UK) officials
Diplomatic peers
Members of the Privy Council of the United Kingdom
People educated at Eton College
Ambassadors of the United Kingdom to France
Officers of the Order of the British Empire
People from Steep, Hampshire
Downing Street Chiefs of Staff
Royal Naval Reserve personnel
People educated at Sunningdale School